Niger National Baseball team is the national baseball team for Niger.

National baseball teams in Africa
Sports teams in Niger
B